Friginatica conjuncta is a species of small deepwater sea snail, a marine gastropod mollusc in the family Naticidae.

References
 Powell A. W. B., New Zealand Mollusca, William Collins Publishers Ltd, Auckland, New Zealand 1979 

Naticidae
Gastropods of New Zealand